The Mycobacterial 1 TMS Phage Holin (M1 Hol) Family (TC# 1.E.35) was identified and recognized by Catalao et al. (2012). Members of this family are found in mycobacterial phage, exhibit a single transmembrane segment (TMSs), and are about 75 to 95 amino acyl residues in length. Although annotated as holins, members of this family are not yet functionally characterized. A representative list of proteins belonging to this family can be found in the Transporter Classification Database.

See also 
 Holin
 Lysin
 Transporter Classification Database

Further reading

References 

Protein families
Membrane proteins
Transmembrane proteins
Transmembrane transporters
Transport proteins
Integral membrane proteins
Holins